In number theory, the Legendre symbol is a multiplicative function with values 1, −1, 0 that is a quadratic character modulo an odd prime number p: its value at a (nonzero) quadratic residue mod p is 1 and at a non-quadratic residue (non-residue) is −1. Its value at zero is 0.

The Legendre symbol was introduced by Adrien-Marie Legendre in 1798 in the course of his attempts at proving the law of quadratic reciprocity. Generalizations of the symbol include the Jacobi symbol and Dirichlet characters of higher order. The notational convenience of the Legendre symbol inspired introduction of several other "symbols" used in algebraic number theory, such as the Hilbert symbol and the Artin symbol.

Definition 
Let  be an odd prime number. An integer  is a quadratic residue modulo  if it is congruent to a perfect square modulo  and is a quadratic nonresidue modulo  otherwise.

Legendre's original definition was by means of the explicit formula

By Euler's criterion, which had been discovered earlier and was known to Legendre, these two definitions are equivalent. Thus Legendre's contribution lay in introducing a convenient notation that recorded quadratic residuosity of a mod p. For the sake of comparison, Gauss used the notation aRp, aNp according to whether a is a residue or a non-residue modulo p. For typographical convenience, the Legendre symbol is sometimes written as (a | p) or (a/p).  For fixed p, the sequence   is periodic with period p and is sometimes called the Legendre sequence.  Each row in the following table exhibits periodicity, just as described.

Table of values
The following is a table of values of Legendre symbol  with p ≤ 127, a ≤ 30, p odd prime.

Properties of the Legendre symbol 
There are a number of useful properties of the Legendre symbol which, together with the law of quadratic reciprocity, can be used to compute it efficiently.

 Given a generator , if , then  is a quadratic residue if and only if  is even.
 If  then the fact that  
  gives us that  is the square root of the quadratic residue .
 The Legendre symbol is periodic in its first (or top) argument: if a ≡ b (mod p), then 

 The Legendre symbol is a completely multiplicative function of its top argument:
 
 In particular, the product of two numbers that are both quadratic residues or quadratic non-residues modulo p is a residue, whereas the product of a residue with a non-residue is a non-residue. A special case is the Legendre symbol of a square:

 When viewed as a function of a, the Legendre symbol  is the unique quadratic (or order 2) Dirichlet character modulo p.
 The first supplement to the law of quadratic reciprocity:

 The second supplement to the law of quadratic reciprocity:

 Special formulas for the Legendre symbol  for small values of a:
 For an odd prime p ≠ 3,  

 For an odd prime p ≠ 5,  

 The Fibonacci numbers 1, 1, 2, 3, 5, 8, 13, 21, 34, 55, … are defined by the recurrence   If p is a prime number then
 
For example, 
 
This result comes from the theory of Lucas sequences, which are used in primality testing. See Wall–Sun–Sun prime.

Legendre symbol and quadratic reciprocity 
Let p and q be distinct odd primes. Using the Legendre symbol, the quadratic reciprocity law can be stated concisely:

 

Many proofs of quadratic reciprocity are based on Euler's criterion

In addition, several alternative expressions for the Legendre symbol were devised in order to produce various proofs of the quadratic reciprocity law.

 Gauss introduced the quadratic Gauss sum and used the formula

in his fourth and sixth proofs of quadratic reciprocity.

 Kronecker's proof  first establishes that

 One of Eisenstein's proofs begins by showing that

 Using certain elliptic functions instead of the sine function, Eisenstein was able to prove cubic and quartic reciprocity as well.

Related functions 
 The Jacobi symbol is a generalization of the Legendre symbol that allows for a composite second (bottom) argument n, although n must still be odd and positive.  This generalization provides an efficient way to compute all Legendre symbols without performing factorization along the way.
 A further extension is the Kronecker symbol, in which the bottom argument may be any integer.
 The power residue symbol generalizes the Legendre symbol to higher power n. The Legendre symbol represents the power residue symbol for n = 2.

Computational example 
The above properties, including the law of quadratic reciprocity, can be used to evaluate any Legendre symbol. For example:

Or using a more efficient computation:

The article Jacobi symbol has more examples of Legendre symbol manipulation.

Since no efficient factorization algorithm is known, but efficient modular exponentiation algorithms are, in general it is more efficient to use Legendre's original definition, e.g.

using repeated squaring modulo 331, reducing every value using the modulus after every operation to avoid computation with large integers.

Notes

References

External links 
Jacobi symbol calculator

Modular arithmetic
Quadratic residue